Tonio Borg (born 12 May 1957) is a conservative Maltese politician who served as the European Commissioner for Health and Consumer Policy replacing John Dalli as member of the College of the European Commission in the second Barroso Commission.

Political views 
Borg's political views have been described as Christian Democratic inspired by Catholic social teaching. He had proposed to entrench into the Maltese Constitution the sections of the law banning abortion (already a criminal offence in Malta).
 
In Parliament, he voted against the introduction of a divorce law, despite it being upheld in a consultative referendum. Borg also spoke out in 2009 against including cohabiting couples (either heterosexual or homosexual) as beneficiaries to  legislation enacted around the time of the Second World War intended to protect tenants during the housing shortage of the time.

During Borg's nominee for commissioner,  the president of the European Humanist Association said: “We believe that this candidacy is clearly damaging for Europe and seriously concerning for the quality of health services enjoyed by those millions of European citizens. There are serious doubts as to whether Borg shares this commitment. As Minister of Justice in Malta, he repeatedly and vigorously opposed women’s sexual and reproductive rights and even campaigned in 2004 to constitutionalize the abortion ban in his home country. In 2011, he also strongly opposed the legalisation of divorce in Malta. In addition, he has openly expressed contempt for the LGBT community and opposed the recognition of the rights of homosexual co-habiting couples in the Maltese Parliament in 2009. Finally, as Home Affairs Minister, he clearly failed to protect the rights of illegal migrants.”

During Borg' nominee to become commission the European Parliament Intergroup speaking on behalf of ILGA (an LGBT advocacy group) has said “Tonio Borg’s views on abortion, homosexuality and divorce are staunchly conservative and outdated. While not necessarily on topics of EU competence, he views his strong opinions as ‘issues of conscience’, which would prevent him from being an impartial commissioner especially with the public health portfolio.”

Other activities
 European Medicines Agency (EMA), Member of the Management Board

Recognition
In December 2018 Borg was appointed Companion of the Order of Merit (KOM) by the President of Malta.

Publications

References

External links

Political offices

|-

|-

|-

|-

|-

|-

|-

|-

|-

1957 births
Living people
People from Floriana
University of Malta alumni
Members of the House of Representatives of Malta
Deputy Prime Ministers of Malta
Maltese European Commissioners
Nationalist Party (Malta) politicians
Recipients of the Order of the Cross of Terra Mariana, 1st Class
Government ministers of Malta
Foreign ministers of Malta
21st-century Maltese politicians